is the fourth season of the JoJo's Bizarre Adventure anime television series by David Production, adapting Golden Wind, the fifth part of Hirohiko Araki's JoJo's Bizarre Adventure manga. Set in Italy during 2001, two years after the events of Diamond is Unbreakable, the series follows the adventures of Giorno Giovanna, the son of Dio Brando (from Phantom Blood and Stardust Crusaders) albeit conceived with  Jonathan Joestar's body, who joins the criminal organization Passione in the hopes of becoming a gangster (or "Gang-Star") and taking control of the organization in the name of reform.

The anime adaptation of Golden Wind was personally announced by series creator Hirohiko Araki at the "Ripples of Adventure" art exhibition on June 21, 2018. Golden Wind is chief directed by returning director Naokatsu Tsuda, who is accompanied by series directors Yasuhiro Kimura and Hideya Takahashi and the senior writer Yasuko Kobayashi. The character designer for Golden Wind is Takahiro Kishida, and the animation director is Shun'ichi Ishimoto. Yugo Kanno returns as composer from previous seasons. The series is 39 episodes long.

The first episode debuted at Anime Expo on July 5, 2018. The series formally aired from October 6, 2018 to July 28, 2019, on Tokyo MX and other channels and was simulcast by Crunchyroll. Like previous seasons, some names are altered in the official English releases to avoid potential trademark infringement. The first opening theme is the 2018 single "Fighting Gold" [02–21] by Coda (Kazusou Oda), and the first ending theme is the 1995 single "Freek'n You" [v1 02–13 _ v2 14–19] by Jodeci. The second opening theme is "Uragirimono no Requiem" [22–39] by Daisuke Hasegawa, and the second ending theme is "Modern Crusaders" [22–37, 39] by Enigma.

On October 4, 2019, Viz Media announced that the anime's English dub would begin broadcasting on Adult Swim's Toonami programming block on October 27, 2019. Toonami's broadcast would go on hiatus after the 28th episode on May 31, 2020 as a result of production delays for the English dub caused by the COVID-19 pandemic. The anime resumed its run on Toonami on August 2 and concluded on October 25, 2020.

Plot
Set in 2001, two years after the events of Diamond is Unbreakable, Koichi Hirose is sent to Italy and tasked by Jotaro Kujo to search for Giorno Giovanna, an aspiring mafia gangster, user of the Stand Gold Experience and a son of Dio Brando. But as Dio possessed the body of Jonathan Joestar at time of his conception, Giorno is technically a Joestar and takes more after them than the father he never knew, despite his blond hair. The series follows Giorno as he joins the mafia organization Passione, moving up through its ranks with the intention of becoming its boss to improve life in Italy. Through the series, it reveals that the Boss has placed Bruno Bucciarati's group with his daughter, Trish Una, so that he may kill her to protect his identity. After Bucciarati suffers grievous injuries from the boss' King Crimson, he, Giorno, and the majority of the gang find ways of defeating the boss. They eventually find an ally named Jean Pierre Polnareff, who helped in killing Giorno's father 13 years ago, eventually giving the gang a trump card, a Stand Arrow. Giorno uses the Stand arrow evolve his stand into Gold Experience Requiem, defeats the boss by making him suffer an eternal death loop and becomes the new boss of Passione, as seen in the finale.

Cast

Episode list

Home media release

Japanese

English

Notes

References

External links
  
 

JoJo's Bizarre Adventure (Season 4)
2018 Japanese television seasons
2019 Japanese television seasons
Dissociative identity disorder in television
Works about gangsters
Television shows set in Italy
Crunchyroll Anime Awards winners
Television series set in 2001
Organized crime in anime and manga
Works about organized crime in Italy